Ude may refer to:

People 

 Louis Eustache Ude (1769-1846), French chef and author in London
 Lojze Ude (1896–1982), Slovenian lawyer, journalist and historian
 Otto Ude (1911–1987), German Wehrmacht Lieutenant
 Christian Ude (born 1947), former mayor of Munich (SPD), Germany
 Hermann Ude (born 1961), German economist and manager
 Iké Udé (born 1964), Nigerian-American photographer
 Filip Ude (born 1986), Croatian gymnast

Places 
 Ulan-Ude, the capital city of Buryatia, Russia

Other uses 
 UDE, a Unix Desktop Environment
 Upper Deck Entertainment, entertainment and game trading card company
 Volkel Air Base's IATA code, a military airbase near Uden, Netherlands
 Udege language's ISO 639-3 code, a Siberian language

See also 
 
 UdeS
 Uhde (disambiguation)
 Uda (disambiguation)
 Udi (disambiguation)